Diplodus puntazzo, also known by its common name sheephead bream, is a species from the genus Diplodus.

References

Sources 

 
 
 
 
 
 
 

puntazzo